Since the creation of Tiny Toon Adventures, there have been a multitude of video games based on the series.  During the '90s, Konami held the license to develop and publish the Tiny Toon Adventures games.  Other developers that have held the license include Atari, Terraglyph, Warthog, Lost Boy Games, and Treasure.

Tiny Toon Adventures series 
The following is a complete list of the video games, the year of release, and the developers and publishers.

References

External links 
 Tiny Toon Video Games, PC And Emulators Page

Tiny Toon Adventures

Tiger Electronics handheld games